Bruce M. Gans is an American physiatrist.  Gans serves as the chief medical officer and executive vice president at Kessler Institute for Rehabilitation

Education 
Gans received his MD degree from the University of Pennsylvania School of Medicine in Philadelphia and an MS in biomedical electronic engineering from the Moore School of Electrical Engineering at the University of Pennsylvania. Gans holds an MS degree from the University of Washington. He served his medical internship at the Philadelphia General Hospital and residency in physical medicine and rehabilitation at the University of Washington, Seattle. Gans received his BS degree in electrical engineering from Union College, Schenectady, New York.

American Academy of Physical Medicine and Rehabilitation 
Gans has served as the president of the American Academy of Physical Medicine and Rehabilitation (AAPM&R) in 2005

Publications

References 

American rehabilitation physicians
Living people
Year of birth missing (living people)